This is a list of albums attributed to the Japanese anime adaptations of the light novel series A Certain Magical Index.

Anime OP/ED

PSI-missing

PSI-missing is a single by Mami Kawada released on October 29, 2008 in Japan by Geneon. The song "PSI-missing" was the first opening theme to the anime Toaru Majutsu no Index. The coupling song  was used as an insert song in episode twelve of the same anime series.

Track listing
"PSI-missing" – 4:23
Lyrics by: Mami Kawada
Music & Arrangement by: Tomoyuki Nakazawa
 – 4:40
"PSI-missing" -instrumental- – 4:23
 – 4:36

Rimless ~Fuchinashi no Sekai~

 is a single by Iku  released on November 26, 2008 in Japan by Geneon. The song "Rimless ~Fuchinashi no Sekai~" was the first ending theme to the anime Toaru Majutsu no Index.

Track listing
 – 4:01
Lyrics by: IKU
Music by: IKU, Kazuya Takase
Arrangement by: Kazuya Takase
 – 4:39
Music & Lyrics by: IKU
Arrangement by: Blues T
 – 4:01
 – 4:35

masterpiece

masterpiece is a single by Mami Kawada released on February 4, 2009 in Japan by Geneon. The song "masterpiece" was the second opening theme to the anime Toaru Majutsu no Index. The song "jellyfish" was the insert song for the anime as well in episode 23

Track listing
"masterpiece" – 4:37
Lyrics by: Mami Kawada
Music & Arrangement by: Maiko Iuchi
"jellyfish" – 4:26
Lyrics by: Mami Kawada
Music by: Tomoyuki Nakazawa
Arrangement by: Tomoyuki Nakazawa, Takeshi Ozaki
"masterpiece" -instrumental- – 4:37
"jellyfish" -instrumental- - 4:24

Chikaigoto ~Sukoshi Dake Mou Ichido~
 is a single by Iku released on February 25, 2009 in Japan by Geneon. The song "Chikaigoto ~Sukoshi Dake Mou Ichido~" was the second ending theme to the anime Toaru Majutsu no Index.

Track listing

Lyrics & Music by: Iku
Arrangement by: Kazuya Takase

Lyrics & Music by: Iku
Arrangement by: Kaoru Ookubo

No buts!
No buts! is a single by Mami Kawada released on November 3, 2010 in Japan by Geneon. The song "No Buts!" was the first opening theme to the anime Toaru Majutsu no Index II.

Track listing
"No buts!" – 3:37
Lyrics by: Mami Kawada
Music & Arrangement by:
"SATANIC" – 4:53
Lyrics by: 
Music by:
Arrangement by:
"No buts!" -instrumental- – 3:37
"SATANIC" -instrumental- - 4:50

Magic∞world
Magic∞world is a single by Maon Kurosaki released on November 24, 2010 in Japan by Geneon. The song "Magic∞world" was the first ending theme to the anime Toaru Majutsu no Index II.

Track listing
"Magic∞world" – 4:08
Lyrics by:
Music & Arrangement by:
"ANSWER" – 5:11
Lyrics by:
Music by:
"Magic∞world" -instrumental- – 4:07
"ANSWER" -instrumental- - 5:10

See visionS
See visionS is a single by Mami Kawada released on February 16, 2011 in Japan by Geneon. The song "See visionS" was the second opening theme to the anime Toaru Majutsu no Index II.

Track listing
"See visionS" – 5:26
Lyrics by: Mami Kawada
Music & Arrangement by:
"Don't interrupt me" – 4:16
Lyrics by:
Music by:
"See visionS" -instrumental- – 5:26
"Don't interrupt me" -instrumental- - 4:17
"PSI-missing -2011 remix-" - 04:30

Memories Last

Memories Last is a single by Maon Kurosaki released on March 2, 2011 in Japan by Geneon. The song "Memories Last" was the second ending theme to the anime Toaru Majutsu no Index II.

Track listing
"Memories Last" – 4:08
Lyrics by: Kurosaki Maon
Music: Tomoyuki Nakazawa
Arrangement: Tomoyuki Nakazawa, Takeshi Ozaki
"Best friends" – 4:58
Lyrics by: Kurosaki Maon
Music&Arrangement: Shinya Saito
"Memories Last" -instrumental- – 4:07
"Best friends" -instrumental- - 4:57

Soundtracks

Toaru Majutsu no Index Original Soundtrack 1 - ELECTROMASTER

The  was first released on January 23, 2009 and was published by Geneon.

Track listing

"PSI-missing"

Toaru Majutsu no Index Original Soundtrack 2 - Dedicatus545

The  was first released on April 24, 2009 and was published by Geneon.

Track listing

"masterpiece"

Toaru Majutsu no Index II Original Soundtrack 1

The  was first released on January 26, 2011 and was published by Geneon.

Track listing

"No buts!"

"Magic∞world"

References

Anime soundtracks
Discographies of Japanese artists
Film and television discographies